Charles Maurice Grahame Moberly (8 December 1907 – 13 August 1996) was an English cricketer.  Moberly was a right-handed batsman who bowled right-arm medium pace.  He was born at Cairo, Egypt and educated at Sherborne School in England.

Moberly made three appearances Dorset in the 1926 Minor Counties Championship against Devon, Wiltshire and Hertfordshire.  While in British Ceylon in February 1927, he made a single first-class appearance for Up Country XI against the touring Marylebone Cricket Club.  He batted once in this match and was dismissed for a single run by Maurice Tate, while with the ball he a total of ten wicket-less overs.

He died at Winchester, Hampshire on 13 August 1996.  His brother in law, George Neale, also played first-class cricket.

References

External links
Charles Moberly at ESPNcricinfo
Charles Moberly at CricketArchive

1907 births
1996 deaths
People educated at Sherborne School
English cricketers
Dorset cricketers
British expatriates in Egypt